Robert A. Dallek (born May 16, 1934) is an American historian specializing in the presidents of the United States, including Franklin D. Roosevelt, John F. Kennedy, Lyndon B. Johnson, and Richard Nixon.  He retired as a history professor at Boston University in 2004 and previously taught at Columbia University, the University of California, Los Angeles (UCLA), and Oxford University.    He won the Bancroft Prize for his 1979 book Franklin D. Roosevelt and American Foreign Policy, 1932–1945 as well as other awards for scholarship and teaching.

Personal life
Born in Brooklyn, New York, Dallek is the  son of Rubin (a business-machine dealer) and Esther (Fisher) Dallek.

Dallek attended the University of Illinois, graduating with a B.A. in history in June 1955. He did graduate work at Columbia University, earning an M.A. in February 1957, and a Ph.D. in June 1964.  While working on his Ph.D., he was a history instructor at Columbia.

He married Geraldine Kronmal (a policy health analyst) on August 22, 1965.

Academic career
In 1964-1994 Dallek advanced from assistant to full professor of history at the Department of History at University of California at Los Angeles (UCLA). From 1966 to 1968 he was a graduate adviser. From 1972 to 1974 he served as vice chair of the department. From 1981 to 1985 he was a research associate at the Southern California Psychoanalytic Institute. In 1993 he was a visiting professor at the California Institute of Technology, and from 1994 to 1995 he was the Harold Vyvyan Harmsworth Professor of American History at Oxford University, which in 1995 awarded him an honorary M.A.

Since 1996 Dallek has been a visiting professor at the LBJ School of Public Affairs at the University of Texas, and a professor of history at Boston University. From 2004 to 2005 he was Montgomery Fellow and a visiting professor in the history and government departments at Dartmouth College.

Dallek is a member of the Society for Historians of American Foreign Relations.

An Unfinished Life: John F. Kennedy, 1917-1963
In 2003, Dallek published the New York Times Bestseller An Unfinished Life: John F. Kennedy, 1917-1963, the first major biography of John F. Kennedy in almost 40 years. Based on archival resources and unprecedented access to his medical records, it revealed his secret struggle with major health problems as well as his love affairs, the backstage role of his father, his appointment of his brother Robert F. Kennedy to the office of United States Attorney General, and speculations about what the President would have done about the Vietnam War if he had lived.

Nixon and Kissinger: Partners in Power
In 2007 Dallek published Nixon and Kissinger: Partners in Power, which claims that they were visionaries and cynics at the same time, in an attempt to explain the ups and down of their diplomatic careers. "The careers of both Nixon and Kissinger reflect the extent to which great accomplishments and public wrongdoing can spring from inner lives." The book was a finalist for the 2008 Pulitzer Prize in History.

Works

Books
 Democrat and Diplomat: The Life of William E. Dodd (New York: Oxford University Press, 1968) read online
 1898: McKinley's Decision – The United States Declares War on Spain (New York: Chelsea House Publishers, 1969) read online
 The Roosevelt Diplomacy and World War II (New York: Holt, Rinehart and Winston, 1970) read online
 The Dynamics of World Power: Western Europe (with Robert N. Burr and Walter LaFeber) (New York: Chelsea House Publishers, 1973) read online
 The Dynamics of World Power: A Documentary History of United States Foreign Policy, 1945-1973 (ed. Arthur M. Schlesinger, Jr., with  Robert N. Burr, and Walter LaFeber) (New York: Chelsea House Publishers, 1973)  read online
 Franklin D. Roosevelt and American Foreign Policy, 1932–1945 (New York: Oxford University Press, 1979) (Bancroft Prize) read online
 The American Style of Foreign Policy: Cultural Politics and Foreign Affairs (New York: Knopf, 1983) read online
 Ronald Reagan: The Politics of Symbolism (Cambridge, MA: Harvard University Press, 1984) read online
 Lone Star Rising: Lyndon Johnson and his Times, 1908–1960 (New York: Oxford University Press, 1991) read online read online
 Franklin D. Roosevelt as World Leader: An Inaugural Lecture Delivered before the University of Oxford on 16 May 1995 (New York: Clarendon Press, 1995)
 Hail to the Chief: The Making and Unmaking of American Presidents (New York: Hyperion, 1996) read online
 Flawed Giant: Lyndon Johnson and his Times, 1961–1973 (New York: Oxford University Press, 1998) read online
 An Unfinished Life: John F. Kennedy, 1917–1963 (Boston: Little, Brown and Company, 2003)
 Lyndon B. Johnson: Portrait of a President (New York: Oxford University Press, 2004) read online
 Lessons from the Lives and Times of Presidents (Richmond, Virginia: University of Richmond, 2004) read online
 Let Every Nation Know: John F. Kennedy in His Own Words (with Terry Golway) (Naperville, IL: Sourcebooks, 2006) read online
 Nixon and Kissinger: Partners in Power (New York: HarperCollins, 2007) Review in New York Times
 Harry S. Truman: The 33rd President, 1945-1953 (Times Books, 2008)
 The Lost Peace: Leadership in a Time of Horror and Hope, 1945–1953 (HarperCollins, 2010) Review in Foreign Affairs
 Camelot's Court: Inside the Kennedy White House (New York: HarperCollins, 2013) Review in Washington Post
 Franklin D. Roosevelt: A Political Life (New York: Viking, 2017)

Journal articles
 'Franklin Roosevelt as world leader', The American Historical Review, 76 (1971): 1503–1513
 'National mood and American foreign policy: a suggestive essay', American Quarterly, 34 (1982): 229–261
 'Lyndon Johnson and Vietnam: the making of a tragedy', Diplomatic History, 20 (1996): 147
 'Tales of the tapes', Reviews in American History, 26 (1998): 333–338
 'John F. Kennedy's Civil Rights Quandary.' American History 38.3 (2003): 36

Essays in edited volumes
 American perceptions of the Soviet Union, in Abbott Gleason (ed.), Cold War-Cold Peace: Soviet American Relations, 1933–1983 (Boston: Beacon Press, 1975)
 'Triumphant America in a shaken world', in Sanford J. Ungar (ed.), Estrangement: America and the World(New York: Oxford University Press, 1985)
 When Presidents Become Weak, in Walter Isaacson (ed.), Profiles in Leadership: Historians on the Elusive Quality of Greatness (New York: W. W. Norton & Company, 2011)

TV appearances
Dallek appeared on The Daily Show in July 2007.  He has made numerous appearances on CNN and on public television and radio, including several on-camera comments included the History Channel's "JFK:A Presidency Revealed" and the American Experience biographies "F.D.R." and "LBJ."

References

External links 
UCLA Profile

Booknotes interview with Dallek on Lone Star Rising, September 22, 1991
C-SPAN Q&A interview with Dallek on Nixon and Kissinger: Partners in Power, April 29, 2007
Robert Dallek on Three Last Questions about JFK (audiocast)

1934 births
Living people
Jewish American historians
University of Illinois Urbana-Champaign alumni
Columbia Graduate School of Arts and Sciences alumni
Columbia University faculty
Boston University faculty
20th-century American historians
20th-century American male writers
21st-century American historians
University of California, Los Angeles faculty
Harold Vyvyan Harmsworth Professors of American History
Bancroft Prize winners
American male non-fiction writers
Historians from California
21st-century American Jews